Basavaraj Kattimani (1919-1989) was a progressive writer, novelist, journalist and was also a member of Karnataka Legislative Council from Karnataka.

He was also known as Kundara Naadina Kanda.

Literary works
 Maji Manthri
 Maadi Madidavaru
 Janivara Mattu Shivadara
 Jalataranga
 Baleya Bisidaru
 Pourusha Parikshe
 Nanu Polisanagidde
 Mannu Mattu Hennu
 Giriya Navilu
 Saitan
 Belagina Gali
 Swatantradedege
 Nanu Kanda Russia
 Kumara Rama - Kannada Bharatha Bharathi - 212
 Sangolli Rayanna - Kannada Bharatha Bharathi - 36
 Basavaraja Kattimani Samagra Sahithya Samputa 1 Rinda 15
 Maadi Madidavaru (Autobiography)
 Sakshatkara
 Pataragitti
 Bangarada Jinkeya Hinde
 Jwalamukhiya Mele
 Kadambarikaran Kate
 Chakravyuha
 Gramasevika
 Sangolli Rayanayaka
 Mohada Baleyalli
 Bengalurigondu Ticketu
 Beediyalli Biddavalu
 Nee Nanna Muttabeda
Kundara Nadina Kanda

Positions held
 He was a member of Karnataka Legislative Council (Congress nominated) from 1968 to 1974.

Awards and honors
 He received Soviet Land Nehru Award for his novel Jwalamukhiya Mele
 He was the president of the 52nd Kannada Sahitya Sammelana held in 1980.
 He was the recipient of Karnataka Sahitya Academy Award

Recognition
 A foundation named Basavaraj Kattimani Foundation has been set up in his name at Belgaum to promote his literary and culture works by the Government of Karnataka. The late research scholar M. M. Kalburgi was made first President of the trust.
 Kottala Mahadevapa has written a book named Basavaraj Kattimani on the life story of Basavaraj Kattimani and the book is published by Kannada Pusthaka Pradhikara.

References

Sources

Kannada-language writers
1919 births
1989 deaths